St. Mary's Malankara Syrian Catholic Cathedral, Pattom, Trivandrum is the central place of worship of the Syro-Malankara Catholic Church. It is the seat of the Major Archbishop of Trivandrum. The tombs of the Servant of God Archbishop Geevarghese Mar Ivanios, Archbishop Benedict Mar Gregorios and of Major Archbishop Cyril Baselios Catholicos are located here.

The foundation stone of this cathedral was laid by Archbishop Mar Ivanios in 1950, and the cathedral was consecrated by Archbishop Benedict Mar Gregorios on 22 February 1965.

Pope John Paul II visited the cathedral on 8 February 1986.

The cathedral was renovated in 2008. The blessing of the renovated cathedral was on 8 November 2008. There were  531 families in the parish community.

References

Sources
 Directory -2006, St. Mary's Metropolitan Church, Thiruvananthapuram.

External links 

St. Mary’s Cathedral
Syro-Malankara Catholic Church - alternative site

Eastern Catholic cathedrals in Kerala
Churches in Thiruvananthapuram
Syro-Malankara Catholic cathedrals
1950 establishments in India
Churches completed in 1965